Jean-Maurice Simard (June 21, 1931 – June 16, 2001) was a Canadian Chartered Accountant and politician remembered as a strong promoter of French language rights and defender of Canadian bilingualism.

He was born in Rivière-Bleue, Quebec in the Bas-Saint-Laurent region near Maine and New Brunswick. He studied at the University of Ottawa in Ottawa, Ontario and McGill University in Montreal. A chartered accountant, he practiced in Edmundston, New Brunswick.

Jean-Maurice Simard was the brother of politician Montcalm Simard, who was a Union Nationale member of the National Assembly of Quebec from 1966 to 1973.

Federal politics

In the 1968 federal election, he ran unsuccessfully as the Progressive Conservative candidate in the riding of Madawaska—Victoria to his Liberal opponent, Eymard Corbin.

Member of the Provincial Legislature

He ran as a Progressive Conservative and was elected to the Legislative Assembly of New Brunswick representing the riding of Edmundston in the 1970 election. He was re-elected in 1974, 1978, and 1982. He was the Minister of Finance (from 1970 to 1974), Chair of the Treasury Board (from 1976 to 1978) and Minister for Public Service Reform (from 1982 to 1985).

Senator

In 1985, he resigned his seat to the legislature to accept an appointment by Canadian Prime Minister Brian Mulroney to the Senate of Canada representing the senatorial division of Edmundston.  He sat with the Progressive Conservative caucus, except for the period from March 15 to June 30, 1988 when he sat as an Independent Progressive Conservative.

Jean-Maurice Simard died in office in 2001.

Footnotes

External links
 

1931 births
2001 deaths
French Quebecers
University of Ottawa alumni
McGill University alumni
Canadian accountants
Progressive Conservative Party of New Brunswick MLAs
Progressive Conservative Party of Canada senators
Progressive Conservative Party of Canada candidates for the Canadian House of Commons
Candidates in the 1968 Canadian federal election
Members of the Executive Council of New Brunswick
Canadian senators from New Brunswick
People from Edmundston
People from Bas-Saint-Laurent
21st-century Canadian politicians